George Darrow may refer to:
George P. Darrow (1859–1943), U.S. Representative from Pennsylvania
George M. Darrow (1889–1983), strawberry expert
George Darrow (baseball), pitcher for the Philadelphia Phillies